United States v. Texas may refer to the following United States Supreme Court cases:

 United States v. Texas (2016), 579 U.S. ___ (2016), a case in which the Court considered the legality of the Deferred Action for Parents of Americans program.
 United States v. Texas (2021), 595 U.S. ___ (2021), a case in which the Court considered the constitutionality of the Texas Heartbeat Act.
 United States v. Texas (2023), 599 U.S. ___ (2023), a case in which the Court will consider the legality of the Department of Homeland Security's guidelines for the enforcement of civil immigration law.

See also 
 Texas v. United States (disambiguation)
 List of United States Supreme Court cases
 Lists of United States Supreme Court cases by volume